East Union Community School District is a rural public school district headquartered in Afton, Iowa.

The district is mostly in Union County, with small portions in Clarke, Madison, and Ringgold counties. Communities in its service area, in addition to Afton, include Arispe, Lorimor, Shannon City, and Thayer.

The district mascot is the Eagles, and their colors are blue, navy, and white.

History
The district was formed in 1960 through the consolidation of schools in  Afton, Arispe, Shannon City, Lorimor and Thayer.

Ken Kasper has served as Superintendent since 2018, after serving as the secondary school principal at Alburnett Community School District.

Schools
The district operates two schools, located on a single campus in Afton:
 East Union Elementary School
 East Union High School

East Union High School

Athletics
The Eagles compete in the Pride of Iowa Conference in the following sports:

 Football
 Volleyball
 Cross Country
 Basketball
 Wrestling
 Bowling
 Golf
 Track and Field
 Baseball
 Softball

See also
List of school districts in Iowa
List of high schools in Iowa

References

External links
 East Union Community School District

School districts in Iowa
Education in Union County, Iowa
Education in Ringgold County, Iowa
Education in Madison County, Iowa
Education in Clarke County, Iowa
School districts established in 1960
1960 establishments in Iowa